Dihydroisocoumarins are phenolic compounds related to isocoumarin. Dihydroisocoumarin glucosides can be found in Caryocar glabrum.

References